Senilità (released in North America as Careless) is a 1962 Italian film. It stars Claudia Cardinale and Anthony Franciosa, and is based on the novel Senilità by Italo Svevo.

Plot
Approaching 40, Emilio (Anthony Franciosa), has lived among ideas and books, and is looking for a short-term relationship with no responsibilities. He seeks to emulate his friend Stefano (a successful womanizer) (Philippe Leroy) and tales of adventure that he has read about in books, but not experienced.

He meets the younger Angiolina (Claudia Cardinale), a beautiful and vivacious lady, whom he perceives as free and innocent. He will educate her in the ways of the world and reduce her naivety.

He happily tells his sister, Amalia (Betsy Blair), with whom he lives, of the encounter. She tells him not to do anything stupid, and asks if the lady is honest.

A colleague drops hints that Angiolina may not be quite the "little angel" that her name suggests. Photos in her home also suggest that she has known a number of men previously. Progressive observations of Angiolina, around Trieste, reveal her with multiple men.

During a trip to a restaurant, Angiolina also develops an instant rapport with Stefano, and he persuades her to pose for him ("dressed") in his work as a sculptor.

Meanwhile, his sister Amalia develops an infatuation with the talented Stefano. When Emilio stops Stefano from seeing her any more, it leads to tragic consequences...

Cast
Anthony Franciosa:	Emilio Brentani
Claudia Cardinale:	Angiolina Zarri
Betsy Blair: Amalia Brentani
Philippe Leroy: Stefano Balli
Raimondo Magni: Visentini
Aldo Bufi Landi: Soriani

References

External links

Careless at Variety Distribution

1962 films
Italian romantic drama films
1960s Italian-language films
Films directed by Mauro Bolognini
Films set in Trieste
1960s Italian films